Agrostemma githago, the common corn-cockle (also written "corncockle") is a herbaceous annual flowering plant in the pink and carnation family Caryophyllaceae.

Description
The sepals have five narrow teeth much longer than the petals. It has ten stamens. It has slender pink flowers. It is an erect plant covered with fine hairs. Its few branches are each tipped with a single deep pink to purple flower.

Each petal bears two or three discontinuous black lines. The five narrow pointed sepals exceed the petals and are joined at the base to form a rigid tube with ten ribs. Seeds are produced in a many-seeded capsule. It can be found in fields, roadsides, railway lines, waste places, and other disturbed areas.

Ecology
In the 19th century, it was reported as a very common weed of European wheat fields and its seeds were inadvertently included in harvested wheat seed and then resown the following season. It is very likely that until the 20th century, most wheat contained some corn cockle seed. It is susceptible to downy mildew caused by the oomycete species Peronospora agrostemmatis.

Distribution

It is now present in many parts of the temperate world as an alien species, probably introduced with imported European wheat. It is known to occur throughout much of the United States and parts of Canada, parts of Australia and New Zealand.

In parts of Europe, intensive mechanized farming has put the plant at risk and it is now uncommon or locally distributed. This is partly due to changing patterns of agriculture with most wheat now sown in the autumn as winter wheat and then harvested before any corn cockle would have flowered or set seed. The main reason, however, is that the cereal seed is better cleaned. The plant was believed to be completely extirpated in the United Kingdom until 2014, when a single specimen was found growing in Sunderland by an assistant ranger of the National Trust.

It can be found in fields, roadsides, railway lines, waste places, and other disturbed areas.

Toxicity
All parts of the plant are poisonous and contain githagin and agrostemmic acid. It has been used in folk medicine despite the risk of fatal poisoning.

See also
 List of poisonous plants

References

External links
How to Grow Corncockle

Caryophyllaceae
Garden plants
Medicinal plants of Europe
Flora of Europe
Plants described in 1753
Taxa named by Carl Linnaeus
Saponaceous plants